Nanhsiungchelys ( or) is a trionychoid turtle from the Upper Cretaceous of Nanhsiung, China. Its genus is derived from the location where it was found, Nanhsiung and the greek word "χελωνα" (chelona), which means turtle. Therefore, Nanhsiungchelys means "turtle from Nanxiong". Nanhsiungchelys has been found in rocks dating to the Maastrichtian of Asia and North America.

References

Nanhsiungchelyidae
Late Cretaceous turtles of Asia
Fossil taxa described in 1966